Cerioporus squamosus aka Polyporus squamosus is a basidiomycete bracket fungus, with common names including dryad's saddle and pheasant's back mushroom. It has a widespread distribution, being found in North America, Australia, Asia, and Europe, where it causes a white rot in the heartwood of living and dead hardwood trees. The name "dryad's saddle" refers to creatures in Greek mythology called dryads who could conceivably sit and rest on this mushroom, whereas the pheasant's back analogy derives from the pattern of colors on the bracket matching that of a pheasant's back.

Etymology
Squamosus comes from the Latin squamosus meaning covered with scales or scaly, referring to the signature dark brown scales found on the mushroom's cap.

Taxonomy
The species was first described scientifically by British botanist William Hudson in 1778, who named it Boletus squamosus. It was given its current name in 1886 by Quélet but is still widely known by the Friesian name "Polyporus squamosus".

Description
Dryad's saddle is an annual mushroom commonly found attached to dead logs and stumps or on living hardwood trees at one point with a thick stem. The body can be yellow to brown and has "squamules" or scales on its upper side. On the underside one can see the pores that are characteristic of the genus Cerioporus; they are made up of tubes packed together closely. The fruit body will produce a white spore print if laid onto a sheet of paper. The spores are 11-15 x 4-5 µm and are long and smooth ellipsoids. They can be found alone, in clusters of two or three, or forming shelves. Young specimens are soft but toughen with age. It is particularly common on dead elm and is also found on living maple trees.

Distribution and habitat
This organism is common and widespread, being found east of the Rocky Mountains in the United States and over much of Europe. It is also found in Australia and Asia. It commonly fruits in the spring, occasionally during autumn, and rarely during other seasons. It plays an important role in woodland ecosystems by decomposing wood, usually elm, silver maple, or box elder but is occasionally a parasite on living trees. Other tree hosts include ash, beech, horse chestnut, Persian walnut, lime, maple, planetree, poplar, magnolia, and willow.

Edibility and uses
Edible when young. They can become infested with maggots and become firm, rubbery and inedible as they mature. Cookbooks dealing with preparation generally recommend gathering these while young, slicing them into small pieces and cooking them over a low heat. Some people value the thick, stiff paper that can be made from this and many other mushrooms of the genus Cerioporus. The mushroom's smell resembles watermelon rind. Polyporus squamosus has a mild nutty flavour.

Gallery

References

External links
 Mushroom-Collecting.com: Polyporus squamosus – Dryad's Saddle
 Mushroom-Collecting.com: Dryad's Saddle, Pheasant Back Mushroom, Hawks Wing (Polyporus squamosus)

squamosus
Edible fungi
Fungi of Europe
Fungi of North America
Taxa named by William Hudson (botanist)